Călugăreni is a commune in Prahova County, Muntenia, Romania. It is composed of two villages, Călugăreni and Valea Scheilor.

References

Communes in Prahova County
Localities in Muntenia